US Post Office-Ticonderoga is a historic post office building located at Ticonderoga in Essex County, New York, United States. It was designed and built in 1936–37, and is one of a number of post offices in New York State designed by the Office of the Supervising Architect of the Treasury Department under Louis A. Simon.  The building is in the Colonial Revival style and is a symmetrically massed, one story brick building with a stone watertable.  The slate covered gable roof is topped by a square, flat-topped cupola with Doric order pilasters.  The interior features a 1940 mural by Frederick Massa titled The Exhortation of Ethan Allen.

It was listed on the National Register of Historic Places in 1989.

References

Ticonderoga
Government buildings completed in 1936
Colonial Revival architecture in New York (state)
Buildings and structures in Essex County, New York
National Register of Historic Places in Essex County, New York